Ahmet Ayık (born March 31, 1938), is a former Turkish World champion of Karachay origin and Olympic medalist sports wrestler in the Light heavyweight class (97 kg) and a sports executive. He won the silver medal at the 1964 Olympics in Men's Freestyle wrestling and the gold medal at the 1968 Olympics.

Biography
He was born in 1938 in Eskiköy, a village of Doğanşar district in Sivas Province in the eastern part of Central Anatolia as the sixth child of a poor family. Ahmet Ayık lost four of his siblings during the 1939 Erzincan earthquake. He began wrestling as a youngster in the traditional  Turkish Karakucak Güreşi.

At age 13, he followed his brother to Istanbul, and joined first Şişli Youth Club and later Beşiktaş JK for sports wrestling. After winning the title of Turkish champion, he was admitted to the national team in 1962, and received training by the renowned wrestlers such as Yaşar Doğu, Celal Atik, Nasuh Akar and Bayram Şit. Besides his medals at two Olympic Games, Ahmet Ayık became two times World champion, two times European champion and won several titles at various international competitions. Ahmet Ayık defeated the legendary wrestlers like  Gholamreza Takhti from Iran and Alexander Medved of Soviet/Belarus. He is also first and one of only two people to ever defeat Soviet wrestler Ivan Yarygin at an international competition.

He retired from the active sports after his second title of European champion in 1970. In 1980, Ahmet Ayık co-founded the Turkish Wrestling Foundation and became 1993 the chairman of this organization. Between 1996 and 2000, he served as the president of the Turkish Wrestling Federation. He is also a member of the board of International Wrestling Federation (FILA) since 1998.

Ahmet Ayık has been married since 1958 and has three children.

Achievements
 1962 Adriatic Cup in Belgrade, SFR Yugoslavia – silver (87 kg)
 1963 Mediterranean Games in Naples, Italy – gold (97 kg)
 1964 Balkan Championships in Constanţa, Romania – gold (87 kg)
 1964 Olympics in Tokyo, Japan – silver (97 kg)
 1965 International Tournament in Tbilisi, Georgian SSR – gold (97 kg)
 1965 World Championships in Manchester, England – gold (97 kg)
 1966 World Championships in Toledo, Ohio, U.S. – silver (97 kg)
 1966 European Championships in Karlsruhe, Germany – silver (97 kg)
 1967 European Championships in Istanbul, Turkey – gold (97 kg)
 1967 World Championships in New Delhi, India – gold (97 kg)
 1968 Olympics in Mexico City, Mexico – gold (97 kg)
 1970 European Championships in East Berlin, German Democratic Republic – gold (100 kg)

References

External links
 

1938 births
Living people
People from Doğanşar
Wrestlers at the 1964 Summer Olympics
Wrestlers at the 1968 Summer Olympics
Turkish male sport wrestlers
Olympic silver medalists for Turkey
Olympic gold medalists for Turkey
Olympic medalists in wrestling
Medalists at the 1968 Summer Olympics
Medalists at the 1964 Summer Olympics
Mediterranean Games gold medalists for Turkey
Competitors at the 1963 Mediterranean Games
Mediterranean Games medalists in wrestling
20th-century Turkish people
21st-century Turkish people